Minshall is a surname. Notable people with the surname include:

Diane Anderson-Minshall (born 1968), American journalist and author best known for writing about lesbian, gay bisexual and transgender subjects
Jacob Anderson-Minshall (born 1967), American author
Charles Minshall Jessop (1861–1939), mathematician at the University of Durham working in algebraic geometry
Barbara J. Minshall (born 1953), Canadian Thoroughbred racehorse trainer and owner who has competed both in Canada and the United States
Jim Minshall (born 1947), former Major League Baseball pitcher
Merlin Minshall (1906–1987), often claimed to have been one of the inspirations behind James Bond, the fictional spy created by Ian Fleming
Peter Minshall (born 1941), Trinidadian Carnival artist (described colloquially in Trinidad and Tobago as a "mas-man")
Richard Minshall (died 1686), English academic, Master of Sidney Sussex College, Cambridge from 1643
Thaddeus A. Minshall (1834–1908), Republican politician in the U.S. State of Ohio, judge on the Ohio Supreme Court 1886–1902
William Edwin Minshall Jr. (1911–1990), Republican U.S. Congressman from Ohio

See also
Minshall, Indiana, an unincorporated community in Raccoon Township, Parke County, Indiana, United States
Insall
Mishal